Gary K. Wolf (born January 24, 1941) 
is an American author. He is best known as the author of Who Censored Roger Rabbit? (1981), which was adapted into the hit feature-length film Who Framed Roger Rabbit (1988).

Early life and career
Wolf was born on January 24, 1941. He grew up in Earlville, Illinois, the son of Ed and Hattie Wolf. His father owned the town's pool hall and later had an upholstering business, while his mother worked in the school cafeteria. As an only child, Wolf would occupy himself by reading comic books and science fiction stories. Wolf graduated from Earlville High School in June 1959.
He later attended the University of Illinois at Urbana–Champaign, where he earned a Bachelor's degree in Advertising and a Master's degree in Communications. He served as an Air Force Captain with the 5th Air Commando Squadron in the Vietnam War, where he won a Bronze Star and two Air Medals.

Wolf and childhood friend John J. Myers, former Catholic Archbishop of Newark, New Jersey, co-wrote a novel named Space Vulture, released by TOR books during 2008. 
Wolf and co-author Jehane Baptiste have a story named "The UnHardy Boys in Outer Space" in the annual anthology of humorous science fiction, Amityville House of Pancakes Vol 3.

Wolf owns an extensive collection of carousel horses. Because of this, Wolf was featured on the cover of the September 4, 1976 issue of Peninsula Living Magazine; the magazine issue itself also showcased his collection.

Wolf resides with his wife of 50 years, Bonnie, and their cats, in Boston, Massachusetts.

Roger Rabbit
Wolf is best known for a series of comedic mystery novels featuring the now famous Roger Rabbit, a cartoon character who inhabits an alternate universe where so-called "toons" (an abbreviation for the word "cartoons") and humans co-exist. The series begins with the novel Who Censored Roger Rabbit? (1981),
which was the basis of the film Who Framed Roger Rabbit (1988). The series continued with Who P-P-P-Plugged Roger Rabbit? in 1991 and Who Wacked Roger Rabbit? in 2013; these two books were non-canonical to the original book, and had more in common with the hit Disney movie. The events of Who Censored Roger Rabbit? are retconned in Who P-P-P-Plugged Roger Rabbit? as taking place within a dream Jessica Rabbit had.

Wolf filed a lawsuit in 2001 against The Walt Disney Company. Wolf claimed he was owed royalties based on the value of "gross receipts" and merchandising sales. In 2002, the trial court in the case ruled that these only referred to actual cash receipts Disney collected and denied Wolf's claim. In its January 2004 ruling, the California Court of Appeals disagreed, finding that Wolf's expert testimony regarding the customary use of "gross receipts" in the entertainment business could support a broader reading of the term. The ruling vacated the trial court's order in favor of Disney and remanded the case for further proceedings. In a March 2005 hearing, Wolf estimated he was owed $7 million. Disney's attorneys not only disputed the claim, but also said Wolf actually owed Disney $500,000–$1 million because of an accounting error discovered in preparing for the lawsuit. Wolf won the decision in July 2005, receiving between $180,000 and $400,000 in damages.

In February 2013, Wolf announced that he and Erik Von Wodtke were working on a development proposal for a prequel film to Who Framed Roger Rabbit serving as a remake of the Disney buddy comedy The Stooge, starring Mickey Mouse and Roger Rabbit in place of the title characters, and depicting how Roger met his future wife Jessica in a subplot. Wolf stated the film was wending its way through Disney.

Selected bibliography
Killerbowl (September 26, 1975)
A Generation Removed (May 27, 1977)
The Resurrectionist (July 20, 1979)
Who Censored Roger Rabbit? (June 6, 1981)
Who P-P-P-Plugged Roger Rabbit?  (July 30, 1991)
Amityville House of Pancakes Vol 3 (December 1, 2006)
Space Vulture (March 4, 2008)
Penumbra eMag Vol 1 Issue 10 (July 2012) (ISSN 2163-4092)
The Late Great Show! (October 5, 2012)
Typical Day (December 7, 2012)
Who Wacked Roger Rabbit? (November 29, 2013)
Jessica Rabbit: XERIOUS Business (May 4, 2022)

References

Further reading

External links
Official Site
Space Vulture

1941 births
Living people
20th-century American novelists
21st-century American novelists
American male novelists
American science fiction writers
People from Earlville, Illinois
Writers from Brookline, Massachusetts
Novelists from Illinois
Novelists from Massachusetts
Gies College of Business alumni
American humorists
United States Air Force personnel of the Vietnam War
American Vietnam War pilots
Recipients of the Air Medal
United States Air Force officers
20th-century American male writers
21st-century American male writers
Military personnel from Illinois